Maials is a municipality in the comarca of the Segrià in Catalonia, Spain. It used to be the centre of the Maials Barony (Baronia de Maials).

Demography

References

External links 

Pàgina web de l'Ajuntament
 Government data pages 

Municipalities in Segrià
Populated places in Segrià